The Brunei national baseball team is the national baseball team of Brunei. The team represents Brunei in international competitions.

National baseball teams in Asia
Baseball